136 Tauri is a white-hued binary star system in the zodiac constellation of Taurus. It has a combined apparent visual magnitude of 4.56, which is bright enough to be faintly visible to the naked eye.

This is a close, double-lined spectroscopic binary with an orbital period of 5.96 days and an eccentricity of 0.00. Tidal effects between the pair may have circularized their orbit and slowed their rotation rates – the primary has a projected rotational velocity of 10 km/s. They have a combined stellar classification of A0 V, and both are most likely A-type main-sequence stars of the same class.

References

A-type main-sequence stars
Spectroscopic binaries
Taurus (constellation)
Durchmusterung objects
Tauri, 136
039357
027830
2034
Suspected variables